William Gilpin may refer to:

 William Gilpin (priest) (1724–1804), English watercolour artist, writer, and clergyman
 William Sawrey Gilpin (1762–1843), English artist
 William Gilpin (governor) (1813–1894), first governor of the Colorado Territory
 William Gilpin (bishop) (1902–1988), English Anglican bishop of Kingston

See also 
 Gilpin (disambiguation)